The Research Institute of Atomic Reactors (RIAR) is an institute for nuclear reactor research in Dimitrovgrad in Ulyanovsk Oblast, Russia. The institute houses eight nuclear research reactors: SM, Arbus (ACT-1), MIR.M1, RBT-6, RBT-10 / 1, RBT-10 / 2, BOR-60 and VK-50.

A senior president of General Atomics said in May 2015 that the world's best reactor for "developing new materials that will be able to endure the much higher temperatures, and endure the more energetic and neutron rich radiation environment inside the reactor", is the BOR-60. BOR-60 had its operating license extended to 2020.

Airborne ruthenium-106 traces measured in September and October 2017 by several European countries have been thought to originate from the Research Institute of Atomic Reactors.

References

External links
 RIAR homepage
 RIAR homepage (Russian)

Research institutes in Russia
Research institutes in the Soviet Union
Nuclear research institutes in Russia
1956 establishments in the Soviet Union
Nuclear technology in the Soviet Union